The Consolidated Royalty Building, on S. Center St. in Casper, Wyoming, was built in 1917.  It was designed by architects Garbutt and Weidner in Early Commercial style.  It has also been known as the Con Roy Building and as the Oil Exchange Building.  It was listed on the National Register of Historic Places in 1993.

It is a double-H-shaped five-story building with elements of design of the early skyscrapers being built in Chicago in the late 1800s.  It has a prominent terra cotta cornice and dentil molding.  Its first floor has been altered and new windows on the upper floors have compromised the building's design integrity however.

References

National Register of Historic Places in Natrona County, Wyoming
Early Commercial architecture in the United States
Buildings and structures completed in 1917